Impossible Spaces is the second full-length album by Toronto musician Sandro Perri under his own name.  Pitchfork placed the album at number 38 on its list of the "Top 50 albums of 2011".

The album was named as a longlisted nominee for the 2012 Polaris Music Prize on June 14, 2012.

Track listing

References

2011 albums
Sandro Perri albums